Keith Chan Siu-kei is a Chinese pop song lyricist and record producer from Hong Kong. Since 1984, he has written over 3,000 Cantonese and Mandarin songs and won numerous awards from various Internet media in Hong Kong and Mainland China, including Best Chinese Lyrics Awards and Best Chinese Song Awards. His work can be found in albums released by many Hong Kong singers, including Jacky Cheung, Hacken Lee, Andy Lau, Aaron Kwok, and Gigi Leung.

Chan wrote the lyrics of "The Song of the Sunset" for Anita Mui as a theme song of the 1989 film, A Better Tomorrow III. The song (besides Priscilla Chan's counterpart, "Chin Chin Kuet Gaw" []) is a Cantonese rendition of Kōji Makaino's Japanese song, .

Chan, alongside composer Peter Kam Pui-tat, wrote the lyrics of "We Are Ready", the theme song for the 2008 Summer Olympics, held in Beijing, sung by various singers as an ensemble.

In 2014, he and composer Su Yicheng wrote "Tears Of Time" for Jacky Cheung's Mandopop album, Wake Up Dreaming.

References

External links
 Baidu - ChenShaoQI

Hong Kong lyricists
Living people
Cantopop artists
Year of birth missing (living people)